Ahmad Al Saleh (born 20 May 1990) is a Syrian former professional footballer who played as a defender for Syrian club Al-Jaish and the Syria national team.

Al Saleh was banned for life by the SFA after he kicked, insulted and spat on a referee after being sent off whilst playing for Al-Jaish against Al-Wathba in a Syrian Premier League game on 3 February 2023.

Club career
Al Saleh began his professional career with Syrian Premier League club Al-Jaish; he joined the senior squad in 2008.

In 2018, Ahmad Al Saleh joined Lebanese Premier League champions Al Ahed. After one season, in 2019 he joined Kuwaiti club Al-Arabi.

International career
Al Saleh was a part of the Syrian U-17 national team in the 2007 FIFA U-17 World Cup in South Korea. He played against Argentina, Spain and Honduras in the group-stage of the 2007 FIFA U-17 World Cup. He scored one goal against Honduras in the third match of the group-stage.

Al Saleh was selected to Valeriu Tiţa's 23-man final squad for the 2011 AFC Asian Cup in Qatar, but he didn't play in any of the three Syrian group games.

He played for Syria at the 2019 AFC Asian Cup; his side exited in the group stage after only picking up a single point. After Al Saleh revoked the Syria captaincy to Omar Al Somah, the press claimed that Al Saleh didn't like this decision and that he disputed it with Al Somah, who himself confirmed this matter in an interview in March 2019.

Personal life 
Al Saleh is of Kurdish ethnicity. His brother, Sheroan, is also a professional player who plays for Al-Jaish SC.

Career statistics

International
 

Score and result tables list Syria's goal tally first.

|}

References

External links

 
 
 
 
 

1990 births
Living people
Kurdish sportspeople
Syrian footballers
Association football defenders
Syria international footballers
Syrian Kurdish people
Syrian expatriate footballers
Expatriate footballers in Kuwait
Expatriate footballers in China
Syrian expatriate sportspeople in Kuwait
Syrian expatriate sportspeople in China
Qamishli
Al Ahed FC players
Al-Jaish Damascus players
Al-Shorta SC players
Al-Arabi SC (Kuwait) players
Henan Songshan Longmen F.C. players
Chinese Super League players
2011 AFC Asian Cup players
Lebanese Premier League players
2019 AFC Asian Cup players
AFC Cup winning players
Expatriate footballers in Lebanon
Syrian expatriate sportspeople in Lebanon
Syrian Premier League players
Sportspeople banned for life